Chen Wu may refer to:

Chen Wu (Han Dynasty) (陳武), general serving under the warlord Sun Quan during the late Han Dynasty
Chen Wu (politician) (陳武), Chairman of Guangxi Zhuang Autonomous Region
Chen Wu (Fengshen Bang) (陳梧), fictional character in the novel Fengshen Bang